Domenico Casadei from the Bologna University, Bologna, Italy, was named Fellow of the Institute of Electrical and Electronics Engineers (IEEE) in 2014 for contributions to direct torque control and matrix converters in electric drives.

References

Fellow Members of the IEEE
Living people
Year of birth missing (living people)
Place of birth missing (living people)